Deus ex machina is a Latin term meaning "god from a device", and is used to indicate a person or event which provides a sudden, unexpected solution to a story.

Deus ex machina may also refer to:

Music 
 Deus Ex Machina (punk band), (s. 1989), a Greek hardcore punk band
 Deus ex Machina (band), (s. 1990), an Italian jazz-rock band
 Deus Ex Machina (heavy metal band), (s. 2004), a Singaporean death/thrash metal band
 Deus ex Machina (Daugherty), a 2007 composition for piano and orchestra by composer Michael Daugherty

Albums 
 Deus Ex Machina (Paul Schütze album), 1989
 Deus Ex Machina (Liv Kristine album), 1998
 The Deus Ex Machina Cycle, a 1999 album by Elodie Lauten
 Deus Ex Machinae (album), a 2004 album by Machinae Supremacy
 Deus Ex Machina, a 2010 film industry-only release by audiomachine

Songs 
 "Deus Ex Machina", a song by Laibach from the 1996 album Jesus Christ Superstars
 "Deus Ex Machina," a song by The Smashing Pumpkins from the 2000 album Machina II/The Friends & Enemies of Modern Music
 "Deus Ex Machina", a song by Omar Rodríguez-López of The Mars Volta from the 2004 album A Manual Dexterity: Soundtrack Volume One
 "Deus Ex Machina", a song by Moi Dix Mois from the 2006 album Beyond the Gate
 "Ghost Prototype II (Deus Ex Machina)", a song by Scar Symmetry from the 2008 album Holographic Universe
 "Deus Ex Machina", a song by Pure Reason Revolution from the 2009 album Amor Vincit Omnia
 "Deus Ex Machina", a song by Cavalera Conspiracy from the 2014 album Pandemonium
 "Deus Ex Machina", a song by Deadmau5 from the 2016 album W:/2016Album/

Television and film 
 "Deus Ex Machina" (Lost), a 2005 episode of the television series Lost
 "Deus Ex Machina" (Person of Interest), a 2014 episode of the television series Person of Interest
 Deus Ex Machina, an episode of the anime Ergo Proxy and the title theme of its soundtrack
 Deus Ex Machina, an episode of the sixth series of Waking the Dead
 Deus Ex Machina, the English title of the 25th episode of the anime RahXephon
 Deus Ex Machina, an episode of Jeremiah
 "Deus Machina", the name of the mechas from the anime, manga and game Demonbane
 Deus Ex Machina, a god character from the manga and anime Future Diary (未来日記 Mirai Nikki)
 Deus Ex Machina, the name of the leader of the sentient machines in The Matrix Revolutions
 Deus Ex Machina, the flagship of the WWII-era Millennium Battalion from the OVA anime series Hellsing Ultimate
Deus ex machina, organisation in You, Me and the Apocalypse

Literature 
 DeusExMachina, a 1999 book of black and white photographs by photographer Ralph Gibson
 Deus Ex Machina, a short story by Richard Matheson
 Deus Ex Machina, a story in the comic book Animal Man, and the title of the third collected edition
 A Character in the book "The Thirteen and a Half Lives of Captain Bluebear" by Walter Moers
 Deus Machina, or Machine Doll, a type of doll created from the likeness of a human being in the light novel and in the manga series Unbreakable Machine-Doll
 Deus Ex Machina, a novel by Andrew Foster Altschul

Video games 
 Deus Ex, a series of first-person video games developed by Ion Storm and released in 2000
 Deus Ex (video game), the first game in the series
 Deus Ex: Invisible War, a 2003 first-person video game developed by Ion Storm Inc. and published by Eidos Interactive
 Deus Ex: Human Revolution, the third game in the series, released in 2011
 Deus Ex: The Fall, prequel to Human Revolution, released in 2013
 Deus Ex: Mankind Divided, the fourth major game in the series, released in 2016
 Deus Ex Machina (video game), a 1984 pseudo-multimedia computer game
 Deus Ex Machina, the name of a metastreumonic force creature from the video game E.Y.E.: Divine Cybermancy
 Deus Ex Machina, the name of a boss in the video game Final Fantasy X-2

See also
 Ex Machina (disambiguation)
 "Ex Deus Machina", an episode of the television show Stargate SG-1